The MBO-1 (МБО-1) is a Soviet bolt-action target rifle for competitive shooting sports (100 meter running deer exercise and Olympic games).

Design 
The MBO-1 has heavy barrel with six grooves (420 mm twist rate) and non-detachable internal box magazine.

All rifles had a wooden stock and fore-end.

Variants 
 MBO-1 (МБО-1) - first model, 4.3 kg, 730 mm barrel, diopter sight
 MBO-1M (МБО-1М) - second model, 5.0 kg, 680 mm barrel
 MBO-1K (МБО-1К)
 MBO-2 (МБО-2) - last model, 5.0 kg, 560 mm barrel, with muzzle brake and optical sight

Users 

 
  - is allowed as target rifle
 : at least until February 2012 ex-Soviet target rifles were stored in the warehouses of the Ministry of Defense of Ukraine

References

Sources 
 Спортивная винтовка МБО-1 // Спортивно-охотничье оружие и патроны. Бухарест, "Внешторгиздат", 1965. стр.99
 Сергей Юрчук, Михаил Коноплев. МБО-1. Произвольная винтовка для стрельбы по мишени Бегущий олень // журнал "Оружие и охота", № 5, 2011

5.6×39mm firearms
Bolt-action rifles of the Soviet Union
Izhevsk machine-building plant products